Littau is a former municipality, and now part of the city of Lucerne, in the district of Lucerne in the canton of Lucerne in Switzerland.  On 1 January 2010 the municipality of Littau merged into the municipality of Lucerne.

History
Littau is first mentioned in 1178 as Litowo. On 1 January 2010, Littau has merged with the city (and municipality) of Lucerne. Art. 5 of the merger treaty states that the new municipality's name is to be "Luzern".

Geography

Of this area, 52.3% is used for agricultural purposes, while 21.1% is forested. Of the rest of the land, 24.8% is settled (buildings or roads) and the remainder (1.7%) is non-productive (rivers, glaciers or mountains). , 21.08% of the total land area was forested. Of the agricultural land, 49.17% is used for farming or pastures, while 3.16% is used for orchards or vine crops. Of the settled areas, 10.47% is covered with buildings, 4.29% is industrial, 1.96% is classed as special developments, 2.33% is parks or greenbelts and 5.8% is transportation infrastructure. Of the unproductive areas,  1.66% is unproductive flowing water (rivers) and 0.08% is other unproductive land.

The former municipality is located along both sides of the Kleine Emme river.  It grew out of four separate sections which each had their own topography and individual history.  The first section was the village of Littau, second Niederlittau and Littauerboden, third the individual farm house of the Littauerberg area and fourth Reussbühl and Ruopigen.

Demographics

Littau had a population (in 2009) of 17,224.  , 36.6% of the population was made up of foreign nationals.  Over the last 10 years the population has grown at a rate of 6.1%.  Most of the population speaks German  (75.6%), with Italian being second most common ( 6.2%) and Serbo-Croatian being third ( 6.0%).

In the 2007 election the most popular party was the SVP which received 29.5% of the vote.  The next three most popular parties were the CVP (26.5%), the FDP (21%) and the SPS (14.3%).

The age distribution in Littau was; 3,821 people or 22.6% of the population is 0–19 years old.  4,986 people or 29.5% are 20–39 years old, and 5,800 people or 34.3% are 40–64 years old.  The senior population distribution is 1,786 people or 10.6% are 65–79 years old, 451 or 2.7% are 80–89 years old and 61 people or 0.4% of the population are 90+ years old.

The entire Swiss population is generally well educated.  In Littau about 56.4% of the population (between age 25-64) have completed either non-mandatory upper secondary education or additional higher education (either University or a Fachhochschule).

 there are 6,636 households, of which 2,218 households (or about 33.4%) contain only a single individual.  467 or about 7.% are large households, with at least five members.   there were 1,292 inhabited buildings in the municipality, of which 1,026 were built only as housing, and 266 were mixed use buildings.  There were 435 single family homes, 91 double family homes, and 500 multi-family homes in the municipality.  Most homes were either two (310) or three (293) story structures.  There were only 31 single story buildings and 392 four or more story buildings.

Littau had an unemployment rate of 3.76%.  , there were 162 people employed in the primary economic sector and about 48 businesses involved in this sector.  2189 people are employed in the secondary sector and there are 167 businesses in this sector.  3532 people are employed in the tertiary sector, with 400 businesses in this sector.   53.9% of the population of the municipality were employed in some capacity.  At the same time, females made up 44% of the workforce.

 the religious membership of Littau was; 10,154 (63.7%) were Roman Catholic, and 1,643 (10.3%) were Protestant, with an additional 966 (6.06%) that were of some other Christian faith.  There are 8 individuals (0.05% of the population) who are Jewish.  There are 1,270 individuals (7.97% of the population) who are Muslim.  Of the rest; there were 226 (1.42%) individuals who belong to another religion, 866 (5.44%) who do not belong to any organized religion, 796 (5.%) who did not answer the question.

The historical population is given in the following table:

Points of interests 
The world's tallest pylon of prefabricated concrete ( pylon 301 of powerline Innertkirchen - Littau - Mettlen).

References

External links

 

Former municipalities of the canton of Lucerne
Populated places disestablished in 2010